The Symposium on Trends in Functional Programming (TFP) is focused on research in the field of functional programming and investigating relationships with other branches of computer science.

See also 
 ICFP: International Conference on Functional Programming

External links
 Home page of TFP

Computer science conferences
Programming languages conferences